Balakrishnapuram is a panchayat town in Dindigul district  in the state of Tamil Nadu, India.

Demographics
 India census, Balakrishnapuram had a population of 19,661. Males constitute 51% of the population and females 49%. Balakrishnapuram has an average literacy rate of 74%, higher than the national average of 59.5%; with 55% of the males and 45% of females literate. 10% of the population is under 6 years of age.

References

Villages in Dindigul district